Northern District Cricket Club is a cricket club based in the upper North Shore of Sydney at Waitara, New South Wales, Australia. They are also known as the Northern District and play in the Sydney Grade Cricket competition. They were founded in 1894 and entered the Sydney Grade competition in 1925.

The club has played at the Mark Taylor Oval since 1925.

See also

References

External links
 

Sydney Grade Cricket clubs
Cricket clubs established in 1924
1924 establishments in Australia